Banksia attenuata, commonly known as the candlestick banksia, slender banksia, or biara to the Noongar people, is a species of plant in the family Proteaceae. It has long, narrow, serrated leaves and bright yellow inflorescences, or flower spikes, held above the foliage, which appear in spring and summer. The flower spikes age to grey and swell with the development of the woody follicles. The candlestick banksia is found across much of the southwest of Western Australia, from north of Kalbarri National Park down to Cape Leeuwin and across to Fitzgerald River National Park.

English botanist John Lindley had named material collected by Australian botanist James Drummond Banksia cylindrostachya in 1840, but this proved to be the same as the species named Banksia attenuata by Scottish botanist Robert Brown 30 years earlier in 1810, and thus Brown's name took precedence. Within the genus Banksia, the close relationships and exact position of B. attenuata is unclear.

The candlestick banksia is pollinated by and provides food for a wide array of animals in summer months. Several species of honeyeater visit the flower spikes, as does the honey possum, which has an important role as a pollinator. It regenerates from bushfire by regrowing from its woody base, known as a lignotuber, or from epicormic buds within its trunk. It can have a lifespan of 300 years. It has been widely used as a street tree and for amenities planting in urban Western Australia, though its large size generally precludes use in small gardens. A dwarf form is commercially available in nurseries.

Description
Both forms occur in the vicinity of Hill River but there is otherwise a marked demarcation.

In the Wheatbelt and east of the Stirling Range, it is a stunted tree. It regenerates from fire via lignotuber or epicormic buds from its fire-tolerant trunk. The leaf margins have v- or u-shaped serrations along their length. The new growth is a pale grey-green and occurs mainly in the late spring and summer, often after flowering. Anthesis proceeds up the flower spike over about 10 to 20 days and is asynchronous. That is, a plant produces flower spikes over a several-week period and will thus have spikes at different stages of development over the flowering season.

Often bright green in bud stage, they are terminal, occurring at the ends of one- to three-year-old branches, and displayed prominently above the foliage. The smell of the open flowers has been likened to a peppery Shiraz wine. Over time, the spikes fade to brown and then grey, and the individual flowers shrivel and lie against the spikes. However, only a very small percentage (0.1%) of flowers develop into follicles; the field study at Mount Adams yielded a count of 3.6 ± 1.2 per cone. The follicles develop and mature over seven to eight months, from February to December, while seed development occurs over four months from September to December.

Taxonomy

Banksia attenuata was first collected by Robert Brown from King George Sound in December 1801 and published by him in 1810. The specific epithet is the Latin adjective attenuatus "narrowed", and refers to the leaves narrowing towards the base. The species has had a fairly uneventful taxonomic history. It has only two synonyms, and no subspecies or varieties have been published; Australian botanist Alex George reviewed the variation in form in the species and felt that the tree and shrub forms differed only in size and hence were not distinct enough to represent separate taxa. In 1840, John Lindley published a putative new species, Banksia cylindrostachya, in his A Sketch of the Vegetation of the Swan River Colony; this has now been shown to be a taxonomic synonym of B. attenuata. In 1891, Otto Kuntze rejected the generic name Banksia L.f., on the grounds that the name Banksia had previously been published in 1776 as Banksia J.R.Forst & G.Forst, referring to the genus now known as Pimelea. Kuntze proposed Sirmuellera as an alternative, referring to this species as Sirmuellera attenuata. This application of the principle of priority was largely ignored by Kuntze's contemporaries, and Banksia L.f. was formally conserved and Sirmuellera rejected in 1940. Common names include slender banksia, candle banksia, and candlestick banksia. Piara (alternately spelled biara) is an aboriginal name from the Melville region of Perth.

The relationships of Banksia attenuata within the genus are unclear. When Carl Meissner published his infrageneric arrangement of Banksia in 1856, he placed B. attenuata in section Eubanksia because its inflorescence is a spike rather than a domed head, and in series Salicinae, a large series that is now considered quite heterogeneous. This series was discarded in the 1870 arrangement of George Bentham; instead, B. attenuata was placed in section Cyrtostylis, a group of species that did not fit easily into one of the other sections.

In 1981, George published a revised arrangement that placed B. attenuata in the subgenus Banksia because of its flower spike, section Banksia because its styles are straight rather than hooked, and the series Cyrtostylis, a large and rather heterogenous series of twelve species. He conceded its large emarginate cotyledons (having a notch in their apex) were quite different from other members, and that it had similarities in flower architecture to another anomalous member B. elegans. He felt B. attenuata to have affinities to B. lindleyana and B. media.

George's arrangement remained current until 1996, when Kevin Thiele and Pauline Ladiges published an arrangement informed by a cladistic analysis of morphological characteristics. They calculated B. attenuata to lie at the base of a large B. attenuata – B.ashbyi clade, but conceded further work was needed before its relationships could be determined, and left it as incertae sedis (i.e. Its exact placement is unclear.). Questioning the emphasis on cladistics in Thiele and Ladiges' arrangement, George published a slightly modified version of his 1981 arrangement in his 1999 treatment of Banksia for the Flora of Australia series of monographs. To date, this remains the most recent comprehensive arrangement. The placement of B. attenuata in George's 1999 arrangement may be summarised as follows:

Banksia
B. subg. Banksia
B. sect. Banksia
B. ser. Cyrtostylis
B. media
B. praemorsa
B. epica
B. pilostylis
B. attenuata
B. ashbyi
B. benthamiana
B. audax
B. lullfitzii
B. elderiana
B. laevigata
B. laevigata subsp. laevigata
B. laevigata subsp. fuscolutea
B. elegans
B. lindleyana

Since 1998, American botanist Austin Mast and co-authors have been publishing results of ongoing cladistic analyses of DNA sequence data for the subtribe Banksiinae, which then comprised genera Banksia and Dryandra. Their analyses suggest a phylogeny that differs greatly from George's taxonomic arrangement. Banksia attenuata resolves as a basal member of and next closest relative, or 'sister', to a clade containing B. elegans and, within that, a monophyletic B. subg. Isostylis. An Eocene fossil cone named Banksia archaeocarpa, around 50 million years old, resembles that of B. attenuata.

Early in 2007, Mast and Thiele rearranged the genus Banksia by merging Dryandra into it, and published B. subg. Spathulatae for the taxa having spoon-shaped cotyledons; thus B. subg. Banksia was redefined as encompassing taxa lacking spoon-shaped cotyledons. They foreshadowed publishing a full arrangement once DNA sampling of Dryandra was complete; in the meantime, if Mast and Thiele's nomenclatural changes are taken as an interim arrangement, then B. attenuata is placed in B. subg. Banksia.

Distribution and habitat
The most widely distributed of all western banksias, Banksia attenuata occurs across a broad swathe of southwest of Western Australia, from Kalbarri National Park and the Murchison River (with an outlying population in Zuytdorp National Park) southwards right to the southwestern corner of the state at Augusta and Cape Leeuwin, and then eastwards across the south to the western edge of Fitzgerald River National Park. Along the eastern border northwards it is found at Lake Grace, Lake Magenta north of Jerramungup, and the Wongan Hills. It is restricted to various sandy soils, including white, yellow, or brown sands, and sand over either laterite or limestone. It forms an important component of open Eucalyptus woodland as a dominant or understory tree or tall shrub. To the north, it is a shrubby component of shrubland. It does not grow on heavy (clay-based) soils, and is hence only found in sandy pockets. Within open woodland, it is found alongside B. menziesii, B. ilicifolia, B. prionotes, Allocasuarina fraseriana, Eucalyptus marginata, or E. gomphocephala.

Ecology

Like many plants in southwest Western Australia, B. attenuata is adapted to an environment in which bushfire events are relatively frequent. Most Banksia species can be placed in one of two broad groups according to their response to fire: reseeders are killed by fire, but fire also triggers the release of their canopy seed bank, thus promoting recruitment of the next generation; resprouters survive fire, resprouting from a lignotuber or, more rarely, epicormic buds protected by thick bark. Bearing epicormic buds and a lignotuber, B. attenuata is one of the latter group, with follicles that may open spontaneously or by fire.

It is moderately serotinous, storing only one-tenth the number of seeds in its seed bank as the reseeding B. hookeriana with which it coexists on sand dunes in scrub at Eneabba north of Perth. Even then, many of its follicles do not release seed after a fire, but instead after successive autumn rains. Cones that had been exposed to water for more weeks had more seed released from follicles over time; around 40% released at three weeks, increasing steadily to almost 90% at ten weeks, compared with a series of controls (which were kept dry) of which fewer than 10% of seed released. Thus, the seed remains in the follicles until successive rains result in seed dispersal in the wetter winter (instead of dryer summer), increasing the chance of survival. After the follicle is split, the seed and separator are exposed to the elements. The wings of the woody separator are hygroscopic, move together when wet, and spread and curl apart when dry. The seed is gradually drawn out by the movement with each wetting.

Still, many seedlings die off in the hot and dry summer months. Seedling survival for the species is lower than for banksias which regenerate by seeding over time. Despite this, the longevity of mature plants allows for maintenance of population until favourable years enable better survival of young plants. As they mature, plants are less likely to perish and are estimated to live for 300 years or more. Analyzing the seed bank and longitudinal results over fifteen years on the Eneabba sandplain showed that B. attenuata would become more abundant over time with fire intervals averaging between 6 and 20 years, peaking with intervals around 10 to 12 years, compared with longer intervals for the reseeders B. hookeriana and B. prionotes. Placed against its rivals, B. attenuata would be dominant between 8 and 10 or 11 years, but at longer intervals is outcompeted by B. hookeriana. Variability in the timing between fires allows all three species to coexist. Exaggerated good and bad weather conditions favours B. attenuata over the reseeding species, which suffer more.

Despite having relatively heavy seed, seed from Banksia attenuata has a high rate of long-distance dispersal. The mechanism for this is unclear, although Byron Lamont has proposed the Carnaby's black cockatoo (Calyptorhynchus latirostris) as a vector; the species seeks out Banksia attenuata cones after bushfire, possibly because the large seeds and greater chance of grubs in the cone make them more nutritious. Flowering has been recorded one to two years after a bushfire.

Flower spikes in late bud are used in the cut flower industry, primarily in Western Australia.

Aboriginal people, particularly the Nyoongar and Yamatji, placed the flower spike in a paperbark-lined hole filled with water to make a sweet drink. Both this species and B. aemula have been credited with the inspiration behind May Gibbs' Big Bad Banksia Men; this species was familiar to Gibbs in her childhood and likely gave her the initial inspiration, although the depictions resemble the latter species. Artist Marianne North produced a highly regarded painting of B. attenuata during her stay in Australia in 1880–1881.

References

External links

Attenuata
Eudicots of Western Australia
Australian Aboriginal bushcraft
Bushfood
Plants described in 1810
Taxa named by Robert Brown (botanist, born 1773)
Endemic flora of Southwest Australia